HD 151804, also known as HR 6245 and V973 Scorpii, is a blue supergiant star about 7000 light years from the Earth, in the constellation Scorpius. It is a 5th magnitude star, so it will be faintly visible to the naked eye of an observer far from city lights. It is a variable star, whose brightness varies slightly from magnitude 5.22 to 5.28, on time scales of a few days. It is one of the brightest stars in the Scorpius OB1 association, and is located half a degree from NGC 6231, which is part of the same association.

HD 151804 was determined to be a Wolf-Rayet star sometime between 1888 and 1894 at the Harvard College Observatory. More modern publications classify it as an  star, however.

Photometric observations published by Bart Bok et al. in 1966 and Nancy Morrison in 1975 indicated than HD 151804 might be a variable star. Variability was confirmed by Arnout van Genderen et al. in 1989. They could not deduce a period, but noted that it varied on a timescale of less than two days. In 1990, HD 151804 was given the variable star designation V973 Scorpii.

Tahina Ramiaramanantsoa et al. studied HD 151804 in 2015, using the BRITE constellation of nanosatellites. During their two-month period of high cadence observations, they found that the star's brightness varied by 0.04 magnitudes, showing a superposition of a large number of periods, the most pronounced of which were less than one day. These different pulsation modes had lifetimes of five to ten days. They argue that these pulsations may be gravity waves, stochastically excited by the star's convective core.

In 1968, John Hutchings discovered that HD 151804 has a stellar wind. The wind's terminal velocity is 1450 km/sec.

References

Scorpius (constellation)
082493
151804
Scorpii, V973
Alpha Cygni variables
O-type supergiants